Colorado City is now a ghost town, in Clark County, Nevada, located under Lake Mohave at the mouth of El Dorado Canyon.

History
Colorado City was a mining camp in the Colorado Mining District (New Mexico Territory) and a steamboat landing at the mouth of the El Dorado Canyon on the Colorado River, for shipments via steamboats of the Colorado River.  Founded in 1861, Colorado City, was at first located in New Mexico Territory, until 1863, when it became part of Mohave County of Arizona Territory.  In 1867 it became part of Lincoln County in the state of Nevada.

In 1866, Colorado City became the site of two stamp mills, located there for ease of supplying wood to operate its steam driven mechanism.  One was the old Colorado Mill brought down the canyon from El Dorado City, and refurbished.  The other was the new New Era Mill.

Site today
The site of Colorado City, and the Colorado River it was adjacent to, was submerged under Lake Mohave following the construction of the Davis Dam in 1951.  What remains of Colorado City lies offshore from the site of Nelson's Landing.

References

External links
  The mine operations at Eldorado Canyon served by steamer and barge. March 21, 1890 from cdm16003.contentdm.oclc.org, The Otis Marston Colorado River Collection, accessed May 24, 2015.  This is the Gila with a load of coal for the mills, per Lingenfelter,Steamboats, p. 69.
Photos from El Dorado Canyon, 1907 from digital.library.unlv.edu, Nevada State Historical Society Photo Collection, accessed 5/12-13/2014. Views of Colorado City site in 1907.  Steamboat service had ceased in 1905.
  View of Southwestern Mining Company's Quartz Mill along river 
  View of Colorado River from Eldorado Canyon. Down river and towards the mill, from just below the house. (probably the mail carrier's boat in foreground)
  Eldorado Canyon from Colorado River. From a boat in mid-stream, looking west. [above] Southwestern Mining Co. Quartz Mill, Mouth of El Dorado Canyon, Boarding House, Store, Millmen's cabins, Weather Observation Station [below]  
  From the Arizona Shore, looking southwest. S.W.M. Co. Mill at outlet of El Dorado Canyon, Store building, end view, Millmen's camps and cabins on "the Mesa", abandoned adobe, home.

Populated places established in 1861
Ghost towns in Clark County, Nevada
Ghost towns in Nevada
New Mexico Territory
Arizona Territory
Inland port cities and towns in Nevada
1861 establishments in New Mexico Territory